Calamonaci is a comune (municipality) in the Province of Agrigento in the Italian region Sicily, located about  south of Palermo and about  northwest of Agrigento.

Sights of interest

Religious architecture 

 Church of San Vincenzo Ferreri (mother church)
 Calvario
 Carmelite Order Convent (1585)

References

External links
 Official website

Cities and towns in Sicily